Lasiopezus variegator is a species of beetle in the family Cerambycidae. It was described by Johan Christian Fabricius in 1781.

References

Ancylonotini
Beetles described in 1781